Greenmount (population: 262) is a rural municipality in Prince Edward Island, Canada.

Demographics 

References 

Communities in Prince County, Prince Edward Island
Rural municipalities in Prince Edward Island